The Mrduja Regatta is an annual regatta held in the city of Split, named after the islet of Mrduja in the Split Gates strait.

The regatta's first edition took place in October 1927. It was not held during World War II, between 1941 and 1945. In the regatta's 75th edition in 2006, 312 sailboats took part in the race.

References

1927 establishments in Croatia
Annual sporting events in Croatia
Sailing competitions in Croatia
Sport in Split, Croatia
Recurring sporting events established in 1927
Maritime history of Croatia